Sappho Leontias (1832–1900) was a Greek writer, feminist, and educationist from Constantinople. She advocated for educational opportunities for Greek women and published Eurydice, together with her sister Emilia, her own journal. She translated Jean Racine's Esther from the French and Aeschylus's The Persians into modern Greek. In 1887, she published a book on home economics, Oikiaki oikonomia pros hrisin ton Parthenagogeion. For many years she was a headmistress for girls' schools in Smyrna and Samos. She became active advocating women's rights, particularly the right to education. She was married to Narlis, a member of the so called Greek Ottoman assembly. They had a daughter called Korinna.

Notes

1832 births
1900 deaths
Greek educational theorists
Greek feminists
Turkish people of Greek descent
Greeks from the Ottoman Empire
Constantinopolitan Greeks
19th-century Greek writers
19th-century Greek educators
Women school principals and headteachers
19th-century women educators
Writers from Istanbul